In the United States Army, a medical brigade (MED BDE) is a unit providing command and control for assigned or attached medical units at Corps level. One MED BDE is typically assigned to one Army Corps and a typical Headquarters and Headquarters Detachment (HHD) for a MED BDE consists of about 65 personnel.

Operations
A MED BDE tasks and organizes its medical assets on the battlefield. It plans Health Service Support (HSS) operations and oversees logistical operations for the group’s units. It serves as a radio control net for group units and performs medical regulation between group units. It also coordinates external support for group units.

Components
 HHD	(Internal Admin/Supply/Maintenance Support)
 S-1	(Group Personnel Actions)
 S-2/3 (Operations, Planning, NBC, MRO, Security, Intell, Training, TOC Operations)
 S-4	(Property Accountability, Group Supply Operations, Medical Resupply, Transportation Support, Maintenance Tracking, ALOC Operations)
 S-6	(Group Communications)
 CN	(Nursing Education, Professional Services)
 Chaplain Unit (Ministry Team Operations)
 Combat Support Hospital (CSH)
 Multifunctional Medical Battalions (MMB) (Replaced Evacuation, Medical Logistics, and Area Medical Support Battalions)
 Medical Company Area Support (MCAS)
 Medical Logistics Company (MEDLOG CO)
 Forward Surgical Teams (FSTs)
 Combat Stress Control (COSC) Detachment
 Medical Company (Dental Services)
 Medical Company (Veterinary Support Services)
 Preventive Medicine Detachments
 Medical Specialty Teams (orthopedic, neurosurgery, ophthalmology, etc.)

Active Medical Brigades of the U.S. Army
 1st Medical Brigade (III Corps)
 2nd Medical Brigade (Reserve; 807th Medical Command (Deployment Support) (807th MCDS))
 5th Medical Brigade (Reserve; 3rd Medical Command (Deployment Support) (3rd MCDS), inc 75th Combat Support Hospital, Tuscaloosa, AL.)
 8th Medical Brigade (Reserve; 3rd MCDS)
 30th Medical Brigade (United States Army Europe)
 32nd Medical Brigade (United States Army Medical Department Center and School)
 44th Medical Brigade (XVIII Airborne Corps)
 62nd Medical Brigade (I Corps)
 65th Medical Brigade (Eighth Army)
 139th Medical Brigade (Reserve; 807th MCDS)
 176th Medical Brigade (Reserve; 807th MCDS)
 307th Medical Brigade (Reserve; 807th MCDS)
 330th Medical Brigade (Reserve; 807th MCDS)
 332nd Medical Brigade (Reserve; 3rd MCDS)
 338th Medical Brigade (Reserve; 3rd MCDS)
 804th Medical Brigade (Reserve; 3rd MCDS, including the 399th and 405th Combat Support Hospitals)

See also
 Military medicine
:Category:Medical battalions of the United States Marine Corps

References